The Helen Anderson House is a well preserved English Cottage Revival structure in Phoenix, Arizona. Characteristic of the style, the distinctive roof is composed of wood shingles and rolled eaves that simulate a thatch roof. It was originally built as a residence for Helen Anderson, the widow of insurance company organizer Carl H. Anderson. The house was added to the National Register of Historic Places on November 30, 1983.

Location
The house is located at 149 W. McDowell RD and is part of the historic Roosevelt Neighborhood in Phoenix, Arizona.

References

Houses in Phoenix, Arizona
Houses completed in 1923
Houses on the National Register of Historic Places in Arizona
National Register of Historic Places in Phoenix, Arizona
1920s establishments in Arizona